Chet Van Duzer (born 1966) is an American historian of cartography.

Life 

He was born in 1966, and grew up in Northern California.

He graduated from UC Berkeley.

He is a member of the board of the Lazarus Project at the University of Rochester.

Career 

From 2011 to 2012, he was a scholar-in-residence at the John W. Kluge Center at the Library of Congress.

He has also received a Kislak Fellowship for the Study of the History and Cultures of the Early Americas.

Bibliography 

His notable books include:

 Sea Monsters on Medieval and Renaissance Maps 
 The World for a King: Pierre Desceliers' Map of 1550 
 Apocalyptic Cartography: Thematic Maps and the End of the World in a Fifteenth-Century Manuscript 
 Johann Schöner's Globe of 1515 : Transcription and Study 
 Floating Islands: A Global Bibliography, With an Edition and Translation of G. C. Munz’s ‘Exercitatio academica de insulis natantibus’ (1711) 
 Seeing the World Anew: The Radical Vision of Martin Waldseemüller's 1507 & 1516 World Maps 
 Christopher Columbus: Book of Privileges: 1502 The Claiming of a New World

References

External links 

 Academia page

21st-century American historians
21st-century American male writers
University of California, Berkeley alumni
Living people
Historians of cartography
American male non-fiction writers
1966 births